

Brown Beach is a locality in the Australian state of South Australia located on the north coast of Dudley Peninsula on Kangaroo Island overlooking Nepean Bay about  south-west of the state capital of Adelaide.  Its boundaries were created in March 2002.  The name is derived from a nearby beach of the same name.  As of 2015, Brown Beach consists of a strip of land located between the coastline with Nepean Bay and the Hog Bay Road.  The locality is zoned for conservation purposes with the view of providing limited built development intended principally for tourism uses, which has a minimal impact and where provided, complements the environment of the locality.  Brown Beach is located within the federal division of Mayo, the state electoral district of Mawson and the local government area of the Kangaroo Island Council.

References
Notes

Citations

Towns on Kangaroo Island
Dudley Peninsula